Barska Stoka is a Montenegrin hip-hop group.

The current lineup of Barska Stoka is Dvorska Luda, Darzee, Joe Shua Kizz and 2JNK Demolythron.

Discography
Stočarski manifest (2008)
Transplantacija (2009) - with Bachi Rimu Trupa

Singles
Fantastična četvorka (2009) - with Noyz

External links
Official MySpace of Dvorska Luda
Official MySpace of Joe Shua Kizz
Official MySpace of 2JNK Demolythron

Montenegrin hip hop musicians
Montenegrin musical groups